The men's discus throw event at the 2015 European Athletics U23 Championships was held in Tallinn, Estonia, at Kadriorg Stadium on 9 and 10 July.

Medalists

Results

Final
10 July

Qualifications
9 July

Participation
According to an unofficial count, 23 athletes from 15 countries participated in the event.

References

Discus throw
Discus throw at the European Athletics U23 Championships